Big Brother 19 is the nineteenth season of the American reality television series Big Brother. The season premiered on June 28, 2017 with a 2-hour season premiere, broadcast on CBS in the United States and Global in Canada, and ended with a 2-hour season finale on September 20, 2017, after 92 days of competition. Julie Chen returned as host. On September 20, 2017, Josh Martinez was crowned the winner defeating season 18 runner-up Paul Abrahamian in a 5-4 jury vote, earning the latter the distinction of being the first person to receive the runner-up prize two years consecutively. Cody Nickson was voted as the season’s America’s Favorite HouseGuest.

Format 
Big Brother follows a group of contestants, known as HouseGuests, who live inside a custom-built house outfitted with cameras and microphones recording their every move 24 hours a day. The HouseGuests are sequestered with no contact with the outside world. During their stay, the HouseGuests share their thoughts on their day-to-day lives inside the house in a private room known as the Diary Room. Each week, the HouseGuests compete in competitions in order to win power and safety inside the house. At the start of each week, the HouseGuests compete in a Head of Household (abbreviated as "HOH") competition. The winner of the HoH competition is immune from eviction and  selects two HouseGuests to be nominated for eviction. Six HouseGuests are then selected to compete in the Power of Veto (abbreviated as "PoV") competition: the reigning HoH, the nominees, and three other HouseGuests chosen by random draw. The winner of the PoV competition has the right to either revoke the nomination of one of the nominated HouseGuests or leave them as is. If the veto winner uses this power, the HoH must immediately nominate another HouseGuest for eviction. The PoV winner is also immune from being named as the replacement nominee. On eviction night, all HouseGuests vote to evict one of the nominees, though the Head of Household and the nominees are not allowed to vote. This vote is conducted in the privacy of the Diary Room. In the event of a tie, the Head of Household casts the tie-breaking vote. The nominee with the most votes is evicted from the house. The last nine evicted HouseGuests comprise the Jury and are sequestered in a separate location following their eviction and ultimately decide the winner of the season. The Jury is only allowed to see the competitions and ceremonies that include all of the remaining HouseGuests; they are not shown any interviews or other footage that might include strategy or details regarding nominations. All evicted HouseGuests are eligible to win this award except for those who either voluntarily leave or are forcibly removed for rule violations.

HouseGuests 

The House Guests were announced on Monday, June 19 at 6 AM PDT through the CBS website. Interviews with the cast were released at 8 AM PDT on CBS All Access. The cast includes season 18 HouseGuest Paul Abrahamian.

Future appearances 
Jessica Graf and Cody Nickson participated in the 30th season of The Amazing Race - filming of which commenced shortly after the conclusion of Big Brother 19. Paul Abrahamian also appeared alongside Graf and Nickson when the three made a cameo appearance on the series premiere of Celebrity Big Brother during the first HoH competition of the season. Jessica and Cody also appeared on Big Brother 20 to host a Power of Veto competition. Christmas Abbott returned to compete for a second time on Big Brother: All-Stars.

Cody, Jessica, and Josh Martinez all made an appearance in the fifth episode of Off the Block with Ross and Marissa. Paul Abrahamian and Josh Martinez both appeared on Big Brother 20 to celebrate Nicole Franzel and Victor Arroyo's engagement. 

Josh Martinez appeared on The Challenge: War of the Worlds. In the same year, he also competed on The Challenge: War of the Worlds 2. In 2020, Josh appeared in his third consecutive season of the MTV series, titled The Challenge: Total Madness. He also competed on The Challenge: Double Agents and The Challenge: Spies, Lies & Allies, thus being the first contestant from Big Brother to compete on five consecutive seasons of The Challenge.

Elena Davies and Mark Jansen appeared on the third season of Ex on the Beach.

Episodes

Twists 

Changes to the main format known as twists occur during the course of the season that will impact the lives of the House Guests during their time in the House. The twists for this season center around the theme of temptation where the House  Guests will be tempted with money, power or safety during their stay. Each temptation however will come with a consequence that will impact the entire House. The overall main twist is being billed by the program as "The Summer of Temptation" for this reason.

Standard Temptations 
During the season premiere the House Guests were presented with the first temptation of the season, in which each new House Guest had a chance to secretly win $25,000. Kevin Schlehuber was the quickest to claim the monetary prize, resulting in two different consequences. The first consequence was personal: Kevin was not allowed to win the first Head of Household competition; to keep his winning a secret, he had to throw (intentionally lose) the competition.

The second consequence unleashed a major twist on the House called the "BB Swap." This resulted in Paul Abrahamian, runner-up from the previous season, entering the House as a full House Guest eligible to win by taking the place of an original House Guest. Shortly after entering Paul was given nine friendship bracelets which gave immunity from the first eviction. Paul was instructed to take one for themselves and give the remaining eight friendship bracelets to the House Guests that did a good job tempting them. The remaining eight House Guests took part in a competition for safety which resulted in Cameron, Christmas, and Jillian being nominated for eviction. The three nominees were given the power to choose how their fate would be determined. The nominees had a choice of a competition or a house eviction vote. Only Cameron chose to have a competition; shortly after, the House Guests voted to evict Cameron from the House.

The following temptation would be during the second Week 1 HOH competition.  During the competition, a golden apple appeared that would guarantee safety for the person who grabbed it, but would eliminate the team from the competition.  Josh took the temptation, eliminating his team from the HOH competition.  In the Week 1 Power of Veto competition, the first House Guest to find a gold starfish and place it on their shelf would earn a Never-Not pass, meaning they cannot be a Have-Not for the rest of the season with the consequence of eliminating themselves from the competition. Raven took the temptation.

Battle Back Showdown
Instead of permanent eviction, the first four evicted House Guests received a chance to return to the game. Unlike last season, this showdown was done in playoff style. They will participate in a 3-Round-Battle in order to gain their spot back in the house. The first competition "Maze Race" will eliminate the bottom two finishers, permanently eliminating them from the game. Dominique and Jillian lost the competition to Cody and Cameron respectively; The second Competition between Cody and Cameron determined which of the first four evicted House Guests will be the last one standing and battle one of the House Guests in the house for a chance to get back to the house. If the evicted House Guest wins against the current House Guest, the remaining evictee will have a second chance to re-enter the house. However, if the current House Guest defeats the returning evictee, no one will be returning to the house effectively blocking the Battle Back. The House Guests unanimously voted to choose Paul to battle Cody in the final competition. Cody chose "Maze Race" as the final competition. Cody won and re-entered the house on Day 30. All three duels aired in a special episode on July 21.

Den of Temptation 
During the first three weeks of the season, the viewing public voted for a HouseGuest to secretly enter a room called the Den of Temptation. The temptation inside could provide an advantage in the game, but also came with a consequence. The public's chosen HouseGuest could choose to accept the temptation or reject it completely. Each HouseGuest could only be chosen to enter the Den once during their time in the House.

Temptation Competition
Due to Jessica accepting the final temptation, the Temptation Competition was unleashed over the next three weeks. Prior to nominations, HouseGuests (except for the current Head of Household) could decide if they wanted to compete in this competition or not. The winner of the Temptation Competition would receive immunity for the week; however, the HouseGuest who finished last in the competition would automatically become a 3rd nominee.

Tree of Temptation
After Cody and Elena's eviction, Julie revealed a new twist into the game which unleashed five possible temptations for HouseGuests to select over the next three weeks. These temptations included powers and punishments. When the apple tree turned red, the first HouseGuest to enter the Diary Room got to claim a temptation from the apple tree. Once a HouseGuest claimed an apple, they were not eligible for another temptation.

Voting history
The Temptation Winner refers to the special competition or event that typically took place on the Sunday episode of the show.
 For Weeks 1–3, the Den of Temptation was in play. The player listed was voted by America to be offered a secret power.
 In Week 5–7, the Temptation Competition was in play. The winner of the competition would win immunity for the week (denoted by ), while the loser of the competition would be automatically become a 3rd nominee (listed in bold).
 In Week 8-10, the Tree of Temptation was in play. Anyone who accepted the tree's temptation would unleash a power or punishment into the house.

Notes 

 :  When Paul entered the game, he was given immunity from the Night 1 Eviction. He had to give immunity to eight other HouseGuests; he chose Kevin, Raven, Dominique, Mark, Jason, Jessica, Ramses, and Elena. The eight remaining HouseGuests competed in a competition to stay in the game, and the three HouseGuests who lost the competition were nominated for eviction. Cameron, Christmas, and Jillian lost the competition. Following the competition, an eviction vote was chosen over an eviction competition by a 2–1 vote (only Cameron voted for a competition; Christmas and Jillian voted for a vote).  
 : Megan chose to quit the game. As she had been nominated, Cody chose Alex as his replacement nominee.
 :  As Paul accepted the Pendant of Protection temptation, he was immune for the next three evictions. Paul chose to keep this immunity a secret until Cody attempted to nominate him for eviction at the Veto Ceremony on Week 1.
 :  Josh was awarded immunity for the week for retrieving the Golden Apple in the HoH competition.
 : Due to Paul's temptation, Ramses was cursed with having to nominate himself as a third nominee within the first three weeks. He chose to nominate himself during Week 2.
 :  Cameron, Jillian, Cody, and Dominique competed for an opportunity to come back into the game. All four evictees faced off in a duel, in which the two winners of the first round advanced to face each other in the second round. Cody won the elimination duels and had to face off against a challenger voted by the HouseGuests still in the game to win his spot back in the house. Paul was voted as the challenger in a 11–1 vote. Cody won the final duel and re-entered into the house.
 :  This player received immunity by winning the Temptation Competition.
 : On Day 44, Jessica used the Halting Hex, which cancelled this week's eviction.
 : This week was a Double Eviction Week. Following the first eviction, the remaining HouseGuests played a week's worth of Big Brother, including the HoH and Veto competitions, and nomination, veto and eviction ceremonies, during the live show, culminating in a second eviction for the week.
 :  Through the Tree of Temptation, Mark earned the power to "Save a Friend" which allowed him to grant immunity to another HouseGuest; he chose Paul.
 : Matt was given a penalty vote for eviction after eating normal food while on the mandatory Have-Not diet.
 : As the house's vote was tied, the Head of Household cast the tie-breaker vote.
 : As Head of Household, Josh chose to evict Christmas.
 : During the finale, the Jury voted for the winner of Big Brother.

Production

Development 

Big Brother 19 was produced by Endemol Shine North America and Fly on the Wall Entertainment with Allison Grodner and Rich Meehan returning as executive producers. This season of the program has been confirmed since August 10, 2016 as part of a multi season renewal between Endemol Shine North America and CBS which also includes its twentieth season scheduled for the summer of 2018. Julie Chen returned as the host of the series.

Broadcasts 
The main television coverage of the season was screened on CBS beginning June 28, 2017 with a two-hour season premiere. This season featured no changes to the schedule that was used in the previous edition, with episodes airing on Wednesday, Thursday, and Sunday each week. The weekly Thursday episode, which airs at 6 PM. PDT, featured the live eviction and subsequent Head of Household competition taking place. During the live eviction, the show will be hosted by Julie Chen. The weekly Sunday episode, which airs at 5 PM PDT, features the nomination ceremony, as well as some highlights from the previous days. The weekly Wednesday episode, which also airs at 5 PM PDT, features the Power of Veto competition and the Power of Veto ceremony, along with more highlights of recent events in the House. The live Internet feeds which have been a staple of the program since its first season will return as part of CBS All Access. Alongside the weekly shows on CBS spin-off series Big Brother: After Dark will return on Pop for its twelfth season. The show serves as a live feed into the House, and is edited for profanity, nudity, slanderous statements and music copyrights.

A special episode was aired on July 21 to show the "Battle Back Showdown" where one of the 4 first evicted House Guests competed to re-enter the Big Brother House.

Prizes 
The House Guests will be competing for the main prize of $500,000. Cash prizes of varying amounts may be offered as "temptations" over the course of the season. Kevin Schlehuber was awarded $25,000 on the premiere episode. The second cash temptation of the season was also claimed by Kevin; this time, it was a smaller sum of $27.

The fan-favorite poll, America's Favorite HouseGuest was awarded Cody Nickson with $25,000 during the finale. While HouseGuests are eligible to win the award, only Megan Lowder was not eligible due to her withdrawal on Day 8.

Reception

Controversies 
Paul Abrahamian received criticism for their controversial mimicking of another HouseGuest. In Week 3, they targeted Dominique Cooper for eviction and decided to apply black facial cosmetics and clothing that resembled the skin of a snake, in regards to a metaphor that she had used in an effort to expose their strategy to other HouseGuests. Given that Cooper is African American, Abrahamian's actions were deemed racist when they referred to the cosmetics as "blackface."

Viewers also debated on Abrahamian's alleged bullying tactics in which they encouraged other HouseGuests to antagonize "outcasts" in the House, especially showmance allies Jessica Graf and Cody Nickson. Some notable incidents include Christmas Abbott propagating aspersions on Nickson's military service, and Alex Ow and Raven Walton engaging in verbal arguments with Graf. Likewise, a physical confrontation nearly transpired between Josh Martinez and Mark Jansen (who defended Nickson), as Martinez was agitating Jansen by banging pots and pans in his face. Another fistfight almost ensued between Abrahamian and Nickson after Abrahamian silenced Graf in front of Nickson in the HoH Room. Abrahamian, who was HoH at that time, bypassed the confrontation instead by sending Nickson out of the room while screaming condescensions at him.

Some fans also perceived Megan Lowder's voluntary exit on Day 8 as a result of bullying. During a backyard conversation, Lowder believed that she overheard Graf refer to Ow as a panda, which Lowder considered to be racist due to its Asian connotation. However, Graf actually said "Pao Pao", which alluded to the nickname of Big Brother 16 HouseGuest Paola Shea, of whom Ow reminded Graf due to them both being Asian Americans. After being informed of the comment by Lowder, Ow clarified the issue with Graf, but they both later assumed that Lowder had fabricated the comment for game-related purposes, prompting them to confront her. Lowder felt overwhelmed by the confrontation and retreated to the Diary Room where she brought up her history of posttraumatic stress disorder with the show's producers. Concerned of her mental health, Lowder decided that it would be best for her to withdraw from the game.

Viewers called for Jason Dent's expulsion from the House after he was caught on the live feeds making rape and assault jokes in front of other HouseGuests. In one instance, Dent commented on having sex with Kevin Schlehuber's wife, Deborah, while all their daughters would be tied up and forced to watch the act. In an interview with TMZ, Deborah said that Dent's comments were disturbing and "the worst thing she's ever seen." On Twitter, Dent's family apologized for the comments but stated that they were taken out of context, which Deborah doubted as she believed her husband would never joke as such about anyone in any situation. Dent also made similar jokes earlier in the competition, such as suggesting to restrain contestant Raven Walton and have male HouseGuests "take turns" on her, and once telling cops about sexually assaulting women at a nursing home.

Jason Dent and Cody Nickson sparked backlash after footage of remarks regarded as transphobic was depicted on the live feeds. During a conversation in the hot tub, Graf informed Dent and Nickson about Audrey Middleton of Big Brother 17 as the first transgender contestant in the show's history. Nickson proceeded to mock the gender identity of Middleton, for whom Dent was also confused about the appropriate pronoun. Middleton addressed the controversy through a Twitter post, urging people not to vilify both male HouseGuests but rather, educate them on the value of emotional intelligence. Nickson was also criticized for using the derogatory term "tranny" several times earlier in the game.

The extent of Raven Walton's lies in the House became a heavily contested debate among fans throughout the season. She often spoke about suffering from gastroparesis (GP), on which she made several inaccurate or false statements, including its hereditary nature, sterility effect, and terminal prognosis. Even before joining the show, Walton had established a  GoFundMe campaign for her treatments, which many skeptical fans considered a scam. Schlehuber also recounted Walton asking viewers for money on camera. Other GP sufferers and organizations like Gastroparesis Patient Association for Cures and Treatment disputed her claims about the severity of her disease, while a plethora of fans condemned them as malingering. However, Walton's mother and her physician took it to social media to combat Walton's critics. Walton also claimed that she and her mother were members of Mensa but their names were disproven to be found in the organization's current directory.

Several House Guests, especially Graf, attracted controversy for certain inappropriate acts in the House. Footage on the live feeds showed Graf making contact with some House Guests in their "private areas" in a joking manner without prior consent. When confronted, Graf dismissed any accusations of such wrongdoing as sexual harassment or invasion of privacy. Ironically, Graf's behavior incited other House Guests like Abrahamian, Matthew Clines, Ramses Soto, and Elena Davies to partake in similar playful acts towards House Guests of the same and opposite genders. In one episode of the show, Ow shared with Martinez how the rampant "touching" in the House, particularly her experience with Graf, made her uncomfortable because it was reminiscent of her cousin who had been raped and murdered.

Viewing figures 

 : Episode 22 was delayed to 8:18 PM ET (7:18 PM CT) due to the PGA Tour golf event running long.

References

External links
  – official American site
  – official Canadian site
 

2017 American television seasons
19